Carlos Alberto Desio (born 25 January 1973) is an Argentine football manager and former player who played as a midfielder. He is the current manager of Peruvian club Alianza Atlético.

Career
Born in Corral de Bustos, Desio played as a youth for hometown side Sporting Club de Corral de Bustos and Independiente. He made his senior debut with the latter in 1993, but played rarely before retiring from professional football due to injuries; he still played in the regional categories, being managed by his brother at Alumni de Casilda in 2000, where both met Jorge Sampaoli who was at the time manager of Aprendices Casildenses.

Desio started his managerial career at his first club Sporting Corral de Bustos, taking over the youth sides and the first team before joining Sampaoli's staff at the Chile national team in 2012, as an audiovisual analyst. He then worked as an assistant manager of Hugo Ragelli in the under-20 team before returning to his home country in 2015, as manager of Talleres de Córdoba's youth setup.

In July 2017, Desio was named Pablo Aimar's assistant at the Argentina under-17 national team. In May of the following year, he was named in charge of the under-19 side before rejoining Sampaoli's staff at Santos in December 2018.

Desio followed Sampaoli to Atlético Mineiro in the 2020 season, but left with the manager in February 2021. On 1 June, he was appointed manager of Peruvian Primera División side Binacional.

On 3 December 2021, Desio was named manager of Sport Huancayo also in the Peruvian top tier for the 2022 season. The following 9 August, after a poor start of the Clausura, he was sacked.

On 7 November 2022, Desio was named in charge of Alianza Atlético also in the Peruvian top tier.

Personal life
Desio's older brothers Hermes and Jorge also work with football. Hermes was a footballer while Jorge is Sampaoli's assistant.

References

External links

1973 births
Living people
Sportspeople from Córdoba Province, Argentina
Argentine footballers
Association football midfielders
Argentine Primera División players
Club Atlético Independiente footballers
Defensores de Cambaceres footballers
Argentine football managers
Peruvian Primera División managers
Deportivo Binacional FC managers
Sport Huancayo managers
Alianza Atlético managers
Argentine expatriate football managers
Argentine expatriate sportspeople in Chile
Argentine expatriate sportspeople in Brazil
Argentine expatriate sportspeople in Peru
Expatriate football managers in Peru
Santos FC non-playing staff
Argentina national under-20 football team managers